Hooray for Love is a 1960 album by the New Zealand and Polynesian jazz singer Mavis Rivers. It was arranged by Jack Marshall.

Track listing
 "Hooray for Love" (Harold Arlen, Leo Robin) – 2:42 
 "I Fall in Love Too Easily" (Sammy Cahn, Jule Styne) – 2:22 
 "Do You Love Me" (Harry Ruby) – 2:24
 "Like Love" (Duke Ellington, Bob Russell) – 2:51
 "Parlez-moi d'amour (Speak to Me of Love)" (Jean Lenoir) – 1:59
 "There Is No Breeze (To Cool the Flame of Love)" (Alex Alstone, Dorothy Dick) – 2:42
 "The Glory of Love" (Billy Hill) – 2:15
 "You Don't Know What Love Is" (Gene DePaul, Don Raye) – 3:00
 "Love" (Ralph Blane, Hugh Martin) – 2:30
 "In Love in Vain" (Jerome Kern, Leo Robin) – 3:18
 "Love of My Life" (Johnny Mercer, Artie Shaw) – 2:39
 "Almost Like Being in Love" (Alan Jay Lerner, Frederick Loewe) – 2:49

Personnel
Mavis Rivers – vocals
Jack Marshall – arranger
Bill Miller – producer

References

1960 albums
Albums arranged by Jack Marshall (composer)
Capitol Records albums
Mavis Rivers albums
Concept albums